are traditional dolls associated with good luck in Japan. A Fukusuke doll is the depiction of a man kneeling seiza style, with a large head and a topknot.

History
It was originally a doll enshrined in tea houses or brothels in the Edo period to bring good luck. In those days, it was considered that Fukusuke would bring "perennial youth, wealth and honor".

The doll usually wears a kataginu (かたぎぬ), a kind of vest with exaggerated shoulders. While this kind of garment was  worn by samurai or court officials, some say that Fukusuke was based on a daimyō of Kyoto. The origin of the Fukusuke doll is not clear, others say that its origin is found in the kami of luck or fuku no kami (福の神) called Kanō Fukusuke (叶福助) in the Edo period.

Fukusuke is often seen in business establishments, and is today is treated as a common good luck icon. Many are made of Chinese porcelain and others handcraft.

Album The Beatles
Fukusuke, with Bob Dylan, Marlon Brando, Marilyn Monroe, a Shirley Temple doll with the legend "Welcome The Rolling Stones", and others, featured on the List of images on the cover of Sgt. Pepper's Lonely Hearts Club Band, album (1967) of The Beatles.

See also

 Maneki-neko
 Daruma
 Tanuki a Japanese raccoon dog, wears a straw hat which protects him from bad luck, an account book, and a bottle of sake in his hands, all symbols of prosperity in business.

Notes

Japanese folklore
Japanese dolls
Japanese folk art
Lucky symbols